, is a Japanese futsal player who plays for Y.S.C.C. Yokohama and the Japanese national futsal team.

Titles 
 All Japan Futsal Championship (1)
 2008

References

External links
FIFA profile

1982 births
Living people
Japanese men's futsal players
Bardral Urayasu players
People from Tokyo